In Treatment is an American HBO drama television series developed by Rodrigo Garcia based on the Israeli series BeTipul created by Hagai Levi. The original series spans 106 episodes over three seasons, which were broadcast from 2008 to 2010. The first three seasons starred Gabriel Byrne as psychotherapist Paul Weston as he treats his various patients.

In October 2020, HBO confirmed the series would return for a fourth season with Uzo Aduba in the lead role. The 24-episode season premiered on May 23, 2021.

Series overview

Episodes

Season 1 (2008) 

The first season follows Dr. Paul Weston and his weekly sessions with his patients. Each night focuses on one specific patient.

Season 2 (2009)

The second season continues to focus on the life of Paul Weston and the complex lives of a new group of patients while he still sees his mentor Dr. Gina Toll.

Season 3 (2010)
The third season continues focusing on the life of Paul Weston (Gabriel Byrne) and the complex lives of his patients.

Season 4 (2021)

Specials

References

External links
 List of In Treatment episodes at HBO
 

In Treatment